The acronym CIFA may stand for:

 Central Institute of Freshwater Aquaculture
 Cayman Islands Football Association
 Chartered Institute for Archaeologists, a professional organization
 Cook Islands Football Association
 Counterintelligence Field Activity
 CIFA (computer) (Calculatorul Institutului de Fizică Atomică (Atomic Physics Institute Computer), an early Romanian computer